Carovigno is a town and comune in the province of Brindisi and region of Apulia, in southern Italy. The town of Carovigno has a population of 17,000 residents. Though it is small, it provides a wide array of sites and services that characterize the local life of the town. Being located in upper Salento, Carovigno is renowned for its production of high quality olive oil.
Additionally, the city offers several local opportunities for tourists, including its close proximity to the sea, the beautiful landscapes of Apulia, and the cultural depth of Salento. 

Each year Carovigno receives many tourists from several other countries (such as Germany and England). The tourist sector has begun to flourish over the past few years as the city is slowly beginning to develop and neighbouring areas, such as Ostuni, have also recently become popular travel destinations.

Physical and political geography
Carovigno is in the northern part of Salento.

Main sights
The Dentice di Frasso Castle which dominates the old town. It was built in the 14th-15th century.
Castle of Serranova
Santa Sabina Tower and Guaceto Tower, two coastal watchtowers built in the 16th century
Home of the renowned Cavaliere della Repubblica Teodosio Iaia, who is also the author of the book "Vi racconto una storia"

International relations
Carovigno is twinned with:
 Corfu, Greece

References

External links 
 Carovigno - Salento high coast of the trulli 

Cities and towns in Apulia
Localities of Salento